Hybrid is the debut album by Canadian guitarist Michael Brook in collaboration with Brian Eno and Daniel Lanois. It was released in 1985 on Editions EG.

A specialist in timbre and texture, Brook pioneered the infinite guitar—a guitar outfitted with a feedback transducer to produce non-decaying sustain of any note—which makes its first notable appearance on this album.

Critical reception
The New York Times wrote that the album "includes hints of Middle Eastern singing and African drumming, subsumed into sustained sounds from Mr. Brook's guitar and Brian Eno's keyboard, all in a misty, faraway sound mix."

Track listing
All compositions by Michael Brook.
 "Hybrid" – 6:18
 "Distant Village" – 4:03
 "Mimosa" – 6:20
 "Pond Life" – 3:40
 "Ocean Motion" – 5:50
 "Midday" – 5:59
 "Earth Floor" – 4:45
 "Vacant" – 5:00

References

External links

1985 albums
Michael Brook albums
Brian Eno albums
Daniel Lanois albums
Albums produced by Brian Eno
Albums produced by Daniel Lanois
E.G. Records albums
Albums with cover art by Russell Mills (artist)